Shake Me Up is the tenth studio album by the American rock band Little Feat, released in 1991 (see 1991 in music). It was the last album they recorded with frontman Craig Fuller. It is also their only album to feature no lead vocals from keyboardist Bill Payne.

Among the album's contributors were Bonnie Bramlett (now Sheridan) who had last featured with the group on Dixie Chicken in 1973 and Valerie Carter who had worked closely with the group's founder Lowell George in his latter years. Another backing vocalist, Shaun Murphy, got to sing lead on a line of Spider's Blues (Might Need It Sometime). Murphy would join the group in Craig Fuller's place after he left in 1993.

The album cover art is by Neon Park - the last cover that he provided the group before his death from ALS in 1993.

Track listing

Personnel
Little Feat
Paul Barrère – vocals, guitar, slide guitar
Sam Clayton – percussion, backing vocals
Craig Fuller – vocals, guitar
Kenny Gradney – bass
Richie Hayward – drums, backing vocals
Bill Payne – keyboards, backing vocals
Fred Tackett – guitar, acoustic guitar, trumpet

Additional musicians
Valerie Carter – backing vocals on tracks 4, 5 and 9
Shaun Murphy – backing vocals on tracks 1, 2, 3, 8 and 10 (joined band 1993)
Bonnie Sheridan – backing vocals on tracks 3 and 10
The Memphis Horns – brass on track 3

Production
George Massenburg - mixing
Nathaniel Kunkel – assistant engineer
Doug Sax – mastering engineer
Alan Yoshida – mastering engineer
Ivy Skoff – production coordination

Imagery
Neon Park – cover art
Kosh – design and art direction
Melodie Gimpel – photos

Notes

1991 albums
Little Feat albums
Albums produced by Bill Payne
Albums produced by George Massenburg
Albums with cover art by Neon Park